The following outline is provided as an overview of and topical guide to organic chemistry:

Organic chemistry is the scientific study of the structure, properties, composition, reactions, and preparation (by synthesis or by other means) of carbon-based compounds, hydrocarbons, and their derivatives.  These compounds may contain any number of other elements, including hydrogen, nitrogen, oxygen, the halogens as well as phosphorus, silicon, and sulfur.

General topics

 History of organic chemistry
 IUPAC nomenclature of organic chemistry
 Organic reaction
 Organic compound
 Organic synthesis
 Retrosynthetic analysis

Current trends
Current trends in organic chemistry include (as of 2020):

Biocatalysis
Catalysis
Chemosensors
Chiral synthesis
 Flow chemistry
 Green chemistry
Mechanochemistry
Photoredox catalysis

Concepts

Acids and bases
Brønsted–Lowry acid–base theory
Acid dissociation constants
Lewis acids and bases
 Chemoselectivity
 Molecular structure
 Aromaticity
 Chemical bonding
 Covalent bonding
 Lewis model
 Molecule shapes
 Bond angles
 Resonance structures
 Conjugated systems
Functional groups
 Stereochemistry
 Conformational isomerism
 Diastereomer
 Stereoisomerism
 Chirality
 Optical activity
 Enantiomers
 Regioselectivity
 Stereoselectivity
 Spectroscopy
 Infrared spectroscopy
 Mass spectrometry
 NMR spectroscopy
Ultraviolet–visible spectroscopy
 Organometallic chemistry

Chemical species

 Acetals
 Hemiacetals
 Thioacetals
 Ketals
 Alcohols and alkyl halides, diols, thiols
 Alkanes and cycloalkanes
 Alkenes
 Alkynes
 Amines
 Amino acids, peptides, proteins
 Aromatics
 Acetophenones
 Anilines
 Anisoles
 Benzene
 Benzenesulfonic acids
Benzophenones
 Nitrobenzenes
 Phenols
 Aromatic hydrocarbons
Toluene
Xylenes
m-Xylenes
o-Xylenes
p-Xylenes
 Aryl halides
 Carbohydrates
 Sugar
 Carbonyl compounds
Acid anhydride
 Acyl halides
 Acyl chlorides
 Aldehydes
 Amides
 Lactams
 Carboxylic acids
Dicarbonyl
Enones
Esters
 Lactones
Imides
Ketones
 Enols
 Enolate anions
 Enamines
 Ethers
 Epoxides
 Sulfides
 Imines
 Schiff bases
 Ketenes
 Lipids
 Nitriles
 Nucleic acids
 Organometallic compounds
 Oximes

Reactions

Addition reaction
Aldol addition
Electrophilic addition
Michael addition
Mukaiyama aldol addition
Nucleophilic addition
Cyclization
Bergman cyclization
Nazarov cyclization reaction
Elimination reaction
Beta elimination
Cope elimination
E1cB elimination reaction
Hofmann elimination
Organic redox reaction
Cannizzaro reaction
Oxidation
Baeyer-Villiger oxidation
Corey-Kim oxidation
Dess-Martin oxidation
Fleming-Tamao oxidation
Jones oxidation
Nucleophilic epoxidation
Oppenauer oxidation
Prilezhaev reaction
Rubottom oxidation
Schmidt reaction
Swern oxidation
Wacker-Tsuji oxidation
Reduction
Birch reduction
Bouveault-Blanc reduction
CBS reduction
Clemmensen reduction
Corey-Bakshi-Shibata reduction
Corey–Itsuno reduction
Fukuyama reduction
Luche reduction
Meerwein-Ponndorf-Verley reduction
Rosenmund reduction
Staudinger reduction
Wolff-Kishner reduction
Pericyclic reaction
Cheletropic reaction
Cycloaddition
1,3-Dipolar cycloaddition
Azide-alkyne Huisgen cycloaddition
Diels–Alder reaction
Nitrone-olefin (3+2) cycloaddition
Staudinger ketene-imine cycloaddition
Dyotropic reaction
Electrocyclic reaction
Group transfer reaction
Sigmatropic reaction
Polymerization
Ring-opening metathesis polymerisation
Rearrangement reaction
Baker–Venkataraman rearrangement
Beckmann rearrangement
Benzilic acid rearrangement
Brook rearrangement
Claisen rearrangement
Cope rearrangement
Curtius rearrangement
Fries rearrangement
Ireland–Claisen rearrangement
Newman–Kwart rearrangement
Overman rearrangement
Oxy-Cope rearrangement
Pinacol rearrangement
1,2-Wittig rearrangement
2,3-Wittig rearrangement
Substitution reaction
Electrophilic aromatic substitution
Nucleophilic aromatic substitution
Electrophilic substitution
Nucleophilic substitution
SN1 reaction
SN2 reaction
Vicarious nucleophilic substitution

See also 
Important publications in organic chemistry
List of organic reactions

References

External links 

Organic Chemistry Lectures, Videos and Text
Virtual Textbook of Organic Chemistry
Organic Families and Their Functional Groups
Roger Frost's Organic Chemistry - multimedia teaching tools

 
Organic chemistry
Organic chemistry
Organic chemistry